was a Japanese "educational society" formed in Japan's Taishō period.  The members declared themselves committed "to strive for the stabilization and enrichment of the life of the Japanese people in conformity with the new trends of the postwar world."

In December 1918, the group was formed in order to sponsor public lectures.  Its founders included Yoshino Sakuzō and Fukuda Tokuzō.  Reimeikai's membership supported universal suffrage and freedom of assembly.  Also, they advocated less restrictions on the right to strike.  The group came together "to propagate ideas of democracy among the people."  The group dissolved in 1920.

It is not to be confused with the Owari Tokugawa Reimeikai Foundation, often just called the "Reimeikai Foundation".

See also
 Nitobe Inazo 
 Yosano Akiko

Notes

References
 Marshall, Byron K. (1992). Academic Freedom and the Japanese Imperial University, 1868-1939. Berkeley: University of California Press.;  OCLC 25130703
 Nussbaum, Louis-Frédéric and Käthe Roth. (2005).  Japan encyclopedia. Cambridge: Harvard University Press. ;  OCLC 58053128
 Smith, Henry DeWitt. (1972). Japan's First Student Radicals. Cambridge: Harvard University Press. ;  OCLC 185405235

Taishō period
1918 establishments in Japan